Shahar is the god of dawn in the pantheon of Ugarit. Shahar is described as a child of El along with a twin, Shalim, the god of dusk. As the markers of dawn and dusk, Shahar and Shalim also represented the temporal structure of the day.

Etymology
The name is a cognate of the Hebrew word Shahar meaning dawn.

In Arabic, the word for dawn is Sahar and comes from the same Semitic root. This root is also visible in Suhoor, the pre-dawn meal Muslims eat during Ramadan.

Isaiah 14:12–15
Isaiah 14:12–15 has been the origin of the belief that Satan was a fallen angel, who could also be referred to as Lucifer. It refers to the rise and disappearance of the morning star Venus in the phrase "O light-bringer, son of the dawn." (Helel ben Shaḥar, translated as Lucifer in the Vulgate and preserved in the early English translations of the Bible.) This understanding of  seems to be the most accepted interpretation in the New Testament, as well as among early Christians such as Origen, Eusebius, Tertullian, and Gregory the Great. It may be considered a Christian "remythologization" of Isaiah 14, as the verse originally used Canaanite mythology to build its imagery of the hubris of a historical ruler, "the king of Babylon" in Isaiah 14:4. It is likely that the role of Venus as the morning star was taken by Athtar, in this instance referred to as the son of Shahar. The reference to Shahar remains enigmatic to scholars, who have a wide range of theories on the mythological framework and sources for the passage in Isaiah.

See also

 Phosphorus (morning star)
 Shamash

Notes

External links
  The Ancient Ugaritic Ritual-Poem of Shahar and Shalem and the Gracious Gods

Children of El (deity)
Dawn
Deities in the Hebrew Bible
Phoenician mythology
Ugaritic deities
Venusian deities
West Semitic gods